Spulerina corticicola is a moth of the family Gracillariidae. It is known from Japan (Hokkaidō and Honshū) and the Russian Far East.

The wingspan is 9–11.5 mm.

The larvae feed on Abies sachalinensis, Larix kaempferi, Pinus parviflora var. pentaphylla, Pinus pentaphylla and Pinus strobus. They mine the stem of their host plant. The mine has the form of a blotch-mine under the epidermis of young shoots, rarely of old trunks.

References

Spulerina
Moths of Japan
Moths described in 1964